Hatfield–Hibernia Historic District is a national historic district located in West Brandywine Township and West Caln Township, Chester County, Pennsylvania. The district includes 19 contributing buildings and 1 contributing site in a rural area of western Chester County. The district includes lands one associated with the Hatfield Mansion and Estate.  Notable buildings include a number of early 19th-century worker's houses, a number of cottages associated with the Hibernia House, and Hibernia Methodist Church (1841).  The contributing site is the ruins of a grist mill.  The district includes the separately listed Hibernia House.

It was added to the National Register of Historic Places in 1984.

References

Historic districts on the National Register of Historic Places in Pennsylvania
Historic districts in Chester County, Pennsylvania
National Register of Historic Places in Chester County, Pennsylvania